State Trunk Highway 88 (often called Highway 88, STH-88 or WIS 88) is a  state highway in Buffalo County, Wisconsin, that runs from WIS 35 north of Fountain City to WIS 37 south of Mondovi.

Route description
WIS 88 begins at a T intersection with WIS 35 in the unincorporated community of Czechville, northwest of Fountain City and southeast of Cochrane. It heads north on a curving route and passes through the communities of Cream and Praag. The highway then turns northwest before curving back north into Gilmanton. WIS 88 enters Gilmanton from the west and meets the western terminus of Wisconsin Highway 121 before turning north. It meets the eastern terminus of Rustic Road 1 and heads north out of Gilmanton. The highway crosses the Buffalo River before terminating at WIS 37 south of Mondovi.

Major intersections

See also

References

External links

088
Transportation in Buffalo County, Wisconsin